Partricia Dunn (1930 – May 3, 1990) was an American actress. She was a dancer in many Broadway plays. She died of lung cancer in 1990.

Filmography 
The Wild Wild West - Ellen Collingwood  "The Night of the Diva" (1969) TV Episode
The Wackiest Ship in the Army -  "The Sisters" (1965) TV Episode
Kismet (1955) .... 2nd Princess of Ababu

References

External links
 
 

1930 births
1990 deaths
American female dancers
American film actresses
American stage actresses
Deaths from lung cancer
Actresses from Los Angeles
20th-century American actresses
20th-century American singers
20th-century American dancers